Academician Lavrentyev Avenue or Academician Lavrentyev Prospekt is a street in Akademgorodok of Novosibirsk, Russia. The avenue is named after Mikhail Lavrentyev, a Soviet mathematician and hydrodynamicist.

Research institutes
 Institute of Cytology and Genetics
 Nikolaev Institute of Inorganic Chemistry
 Rzhanov Institute of Semiconductor Physics
 Institute of Soil Science and Agrochemistry
 Lavrentyev Institute of Hydrodynamics
 Institute of Chemical Biology and Fundamental Medicine
 Budker Institute of Nuclear Physics
 Institute of Laser Physics
 Boreskov Institute of Catalysis
 Institute of Computational Technologies
 Ershov Institute of Informatics Systems
 Institute of Computational Mathematics and Mathematical Geophysics
 Kutateladze Institute of Thermophysics
 Institute of Economics and Industrial Engineering
 Vorozhtsov Novosibirsk Institute of Organic Chemistry
 Institute of Archaeology and Ethnography

Gallery

References

Streets in Novosibirsk
Sovetsky District, Novosibirsk